Nanaka may refer to:
 Nanaka 6/17, a manga
 former name of Nana, Rajasthan, a village in India